John Thomas Hunt (February 2, 1860 – November 30, 1916) was a U.S. Representative from Missouri.

Born in St. Louis, Missouri, Hunt attended the common schools.
In his youth, he was a professional ball player and umpire.
He became a stonecutter and later a stone contractor.

Hunt was elected as a Democrat to the Fifty-eighth and Fifty-ninth Congresses (March 4, 1903 – March 3, 1907). 
During his service in Congress, he was the only Representative to have a union card.
He was an unsuccessful candidate for renomination in 1906 and for nomination in 1908.
He resumed the business of stone contractor.
He died in St. Louis, Missouri, November 30, 1916.
He was interred in Calvary Cemetery.

References

External links
John Thomas Hunt entry at The Political Graveyard

1860 births
1916 deaths
American stonemasons
Politicians from St. Louis
Democratic Party members of the United States House of Representatives from Missouri
19th-century American politicians